The London Daily News was a short-lived London newspaper owned by Robert Maxwell. It was published from 24 February to 23 July 1987.

History
The London Daily News was intended to be a "24-hour" paper challenging the local dominance of the Evening Standard. "For the city that never sleeps, the paper that never stops", ran the promotional slogan. The Standard’s owners, Associated Newspapers, responded by reviving the Evening News at a lower price to squeeze the London Daily News out of the market. A price war ensued finishing with the London Daily News selling at 10p and the Evening News at 5p.

Maxwell was dismissive when he heard about the cut-price Evening News. He told the BBC: "The Evening Standard and Lord Rothermere are so worried about their monopoly – which the London Daily News is finally breaking – and so scared about the huge demand for our paper, that they've brought out a cheapo Evening News, which is really a joke." After the London Daily News collapsed, The Evening Standards publishers, Associated Newspapers, continued the Evening News for some months as a separate brand, aiming for a more downmarket readership than the Evening Standard before re-absorbing it into its sister publication and former rival. The London Daily News was the first home of the Alex cartoon, later published by The Independent and the Daily Telegraph.

Maxwell admitted defeat on 25 July 1987 an hour after paying undisclosed damages to Associated Newspapers for accusing it of lying about the Evening Standards circulation figures. Starting the London Daily News, which published four editions a day, had cost him $40 million (then about £24.96 million), Reuters estimated. His paper was “selling less than 100,000 copies, when minimum sales targets were 200,000 by this time", Reuters reported Maxwell as commenting.

Exclusives
The paper exposed a scandal relating to war crimes in Sri Lanka when it revealed and confirmed the presence of British mercenaries of the secret KMS unit working with Sri Lankan troops, and the subsequent termination of this following the discovery of atrocities committed against the Tamil population. The KMS mercenaries walked out after complaining that the Sri Lankan Special Task Force "was running out of control and was indiscriminately killing and torturing Tamil civilians". Human Rights Lawyer Karen Parker cited the news article in one of her NGO interventions criticising the Government of Sri Lanka at the United Nations Human Rights Commission.

References

1987 in London
Defunct newspapers published in the United Kingdom
London newspapers
Newspapers established in 1987
Publications disestablished in 1987